Boissy-Saint-Léger is a commune in the Val-de-Marne department in the southeastern suburbs of Paris, France.

Population

Transport
Boissy-Saint-Léger is served by Boissy-Saint-Léger station on Paris RER line A. The station is the line's terminus.

Education
Public schools in the commune:
7 preschools
7 elementary schools
 Two junior high schools (collèges): Amédée Dunois and Blaise Cendrars 
 Two senior high schools: Lycée Gillaume Budé and Lycée Christoph Colombe

Private schools:
 (junior and senior high school)
École des Sacrés-Cœurs (preschool and primary school)

See also

Communes of the Val-de-Marne department

References

External links
Boissy-Saint-Léger official website

Communes of Val-de-Marne